Espenes is a small village area in the northeastern part of the municipality of Grimstad in Agder county, Norway. The village lies near the Skaggerak coast, just north of the village of Fevik and just south of the town of Arendal.

References

Villages in Agder
Grimstad